5080 may refer to:

 5080, a number in the 5000 (number) range
 A.D. 5080, a year of the 6th millennium CE
 5080 BCE,a year in the 6th millennium BC
 5080 Oja, an asteroid in the Asteroid Belt, the 5080th asteroid registered
 Tokyu 5080 series, an electric multiple unit train series

See also